Fitzer is a German language metonymic occupational surname and may refer to:
Scott Fitzer
Ulrike Fitzer (born 1982), female German Air Force pilot

References 

German-language surnames
Occupational surnames